Kristin Bauer van Straten ( Neubauer) is an American film and television actress, notable for her roles as vampire Pamela Swynford De Beaufort on the HBO television series True Blood, Jerry's girlfriend Gillian ("man hands") on Seinfeld, and as Maleficent in the ABC series Once Upon a Time.

Personal life
Bauer van Straten was born Kristin Neubauer  in Racine, Wisconsin. She is of German descent. During childhood, she played sports, rode horses, and fired shotguns. She graduated from The Prairie School in Wind Point.
Bauer van Straten studied fine arts at Washington University in St. Louis, as well as in Boston and at New York City’s Parsons The New School for Design in her youth, but decided to become an actress and moved to Los Angeles, where she has been living since she began acting in 1994. She continues to draw and paint. Her works include commissioned portraits.

On August 1, 2009, she married musician Abri van Straten.

Acting career

In 1995, Bauer van Straten had her first regular role in a television series, as Maggie Reynolds on The Crew. Other recurring roles include Geneva Renault in Total Security, Candy Cooper in That's Life, Rebecca Colfax in Dirty Sexy Money, and Belinda Slypich in Hidden Hills. Perhaps her best known film role was in Dancing at the Blue Iguana in 2000. Bauer van Straten played a porn star appearing as the featured act at a Los Angeles strip club and performed an extended nude dance. 

In 2001, she starred in the award-winning short film Room 302, and in 2004 she had a minor role in the film 50 First Dates, which starred Adam Sandler. In the animated series Justice League, she supplied the voice of the superhero Mera.

She has also made a number of guest appearances in several television shows, including LA Law, Seinfeld, Everybody Loves Raymond, Dark Angel, Two and a Half Men, Star Trek: Enterprise, CSI: Crime Scene Investigation, Desperate Housewives, and George Lopez. She famously appeared in a Seinfeld episode (The Bizarro Jerry) as Gillian, Jerry's girlfriend with "man hands", although the actual "man hands", seen only in close-ups, belonged to a member of the production crew.

From 2008 to its conclusion in 2014, Bauer van Straten played the vampire Pamela Swynford De Beaufort on the HBO fantasy drama series, True Blood. On December 8, 2009, TV Guide confirmed she had been promoted from recurring status to a series regular. 

In 2011, she was cast in the fantasy television series Once Upon a Time as the evil fairy Maleficent (the wicked fairy godmother, using the name from Disney's Sleeping Beauty), the rival of the Evil Queen of Snow White.

Activism
Bauer van Straten carries out conservation work to improve the treatment of animals. In 2011, she teamed with the Animal Legal Defense Fund in an unsuccessful fight to release Tony, a Siberian-Bengal tiger who has been kept as a roadside attraction at the Tiger Truck Stop in Grosse Tête, Louisiana since 2000. She  worked with Physicians Committee for Responsible Medicine to promote cosmetics that are not tested on animals. She is a vegetarian and has used her platform to support shelter animals by promoting adoption.

Bauer van Straten also encourages people to live more sustainably and be more eco-friendly.

Filmography

Film

Television

Music videos

Podcasts

References

External links

 
 

American film actresses
American television actresses
American voice actresses
People from Racine, Wisconsin
Actresses from Wisconsin
American people of German descent
Living people
Sam Fox School of Design & Visual Arts alumni
20th-century American actresses
21st-century American actresses
Year of birth missing (living people)